The Festival de Lima, also known as "Encuentro Latinoamericano de Cine de Lima," is a film festival held annually by the Catholic University of Peru (PUCP). Its original name was Festival Elcine. The official name has been Festival of Lima, Encuentro Latinoamericano de Cine since 2007.

The festival 
The first festival was first held in 1997 under the name "Elcine Festival" at the PUCP Cultural Center in San Isidro District Lima, which continues to host the main festival. Conceived as a "Latin American Meeting of Cinema" the growth of the festival has expanded to the Centro Cultural de la PUCP, brought in Cineplanet, and various concert halls and cultural centers in Lima. 

The festival is held annually in the first half of August. Being the main film event in Peru and one of the most important events in Lima's cultural calendar it is a noted festival for regional cinema in Latin America. The Festival launches & promotes the work of Peruvian directors, such as Claudia Llosa and Josué Méndez, and seeks to increase distribution of Latin American films in Peru and elsewhere. In addition to the films in competition, the festival includes screenings of international films, tributes to figures in the film industry, and other cultural activities such as master classes, lectures and art exhibitions.

Competition and awards 
The official competition includes two main categories—Fiction and Documentary—and all films must be Latin American. 

The award from the festival is called "Trophy Spondylus", which consists of a stylized statue of a Spondylus, a marine mollusk widely used in the pre-Columbian art of Peru. This prize is awarded in various categories of the festival.

Categories

Official awards 

 Best Picture
 Best Screenplay
 Best Cinematography
 Best Actor
 Best Actress
 Best First Film
 International Critics Prize for Best Film
 Best Documentary
 First Choice Award
 Second Choice Award

Other awards 
 Award for Best Film CONACINE Peruana
 Films in Progress
 Peruvian Best Film voted by the Public
 Best Unfilmed Screenplay

External links 
 Official Website of the Festival de Lima, Encuentro Latinoamericano de Cine
 Coverage Elcine 11 º Festival de Lima in Cinencuentro.com
 Coverage of the 10th Festival of Lima Elcine Cinencuentro.com
 Coverage of the 9th Festival of Lima Elcine Cinencuentro.com

Film festivals in Peru